Shahdara Village is a village situated in the suburbs of Margalla Hills in Islamabad, Pakistan. It is located 7 km from Barakhao, 10 km away from Aiwan-e-Sadr (the official residence of the President of Pakistan),  and 15 km from Faizabad Islamabad. Shahdara Village is also located near Quaid-e-Azam University.

The climate of Shahdara is similar to Islamabad: winter is from November to February, spring is from March to April, summer is from May to June, rainy monsoon season is in July and August, and autumn is from September to October.

Languages 
Pothohari is the most common language spoken in Shahdara Village, but citizens also speak Punjabi and Urdu.

Economy 
The economy of Shahdara Village relies heavily on agriculture. Citizens also commute to nearby areas like Islamabad, Rawalpindi, and Murree for employment. Locals earn income by selling food and cultural items to visitors at Shahdara Picnic Point.

More about Shahdara 

Villages in Pakistan
Tourist attractions in Islamabad